HMS Howe was an  ironclad battleship built for the Royal Navy during the 1880s. The ship was assigned to the Channel Fleet in mid-1890 and was badly damaged when she ran aground in late 1892. After repairs were completed, Howe was transferred to the Mediterranean Fleet in late 1893. She returned home in late 1896 and became a guardship in Ireland. Howe remained there until late 1901 when she was assigned to the Reserve Fleet. The ship was paid off in three years later and then sold for scrap in 1910.

Design and description

The ships had a complement of 525–536 officers and ratings.

Howe was powered by two 3-cylinder inverted compound-expansion steam engines, each driving one propeller.

Armament and armour
Unlike Collingwood, the later four Admiral-class ships had a main armament of 30-calibre rifled breech-loading (BL)  Mk II guns, rather than the  guns in the earlier ship. The four guns were mounted in two twin-gun, pear-shaped barbettes, one forward and one aft of the superstructure. The barbettes were open, without hoods or gun shields, and the guns were fully exposed. There were significant delays in the production of the heavy guns for this ship and her sisters, due to cracking in the innermost layer of the guns, that significantly delayed the delivery of these ships. Even as late as early 1890, Howe only had two of her guns installed.

The secondary armament of the Admirals consisted of six 26-calibre BL  Mk IV guns on single mounts positioned on the upper deck amidships, three on each broadside. They fired  shells that were credited with the ability to penetrate  of wrought iron at 1000 yards. Beginning around 1895 all of these guns were converted into quick-firing guns (QF) with a much faster rate of fire. For defence against torpedo boats the ships carried a dozen QF 6-pounder  Hotchkiss guns and 10 QF 3-pdr  Hotchkiss guns.

The armour scheme of Howe and Rodney was virtually identical to that of Collingwood. The waterline armour belt of compound armour extended across the middle of the ships between the rear of each barbette for a

Construction and career

Howe, named after Admiral Richard Howe, was the fourth ship of her name to serve in the Royal Navy. The ship was laid down at Pembroke Dockyard on 7 June 1882, launched on 28 April 1885 and was delivered at Portsmouth on 15 November 1885, complete except for her main armament, at a cost of £639,434. She was commissioned on 18 July 1889 to take part in fleet manoeuvres. Finally fully armed, she was assigned to the Channel Fleet in May 1890. The ship paid off at Chatham Dockyard for repairs and an overhaul that cost £45,000.

In October of that year, Howe was transferred to the Mediterranean Fleet where she remained until December 1896, when she became port guardship at Queenstown. The ship was then assigned to the Reserve Fleet and then fully decommissioned after her last manoeuvres in September 1904. Howe was sold to Thos. W. Ward for £25,100 on 11 October 1910 and towed to Briton Ferry, Wales, to be broken up in January 1912.

Notes

Bibliography

External links

Photos of Howe on battleships-cruisers.co.uk

 

Admiral-class battleships
Victorian-era battleships of the United Kingdom
Ships built in Pembroke Dock
1885 ships
Maritime incidents in 1892
Shipwrecks of Spain